Eleuter may refer to:
 Jerzy Eleuter Szymonowicz Siemiginowski (1660–1711), aka Siemiginowski-Eleuter (c. 1660 – c. 1711), a Polish painter and engraver
 Pseudonym of Jarosław Iwaszkiewicz (1894–1980), a Polish writer

See also 
 Eleutherius (disambiguation)
 Eleuterio

Polish given names